The canton of Lens-Est  is a former canton situated in the department of the Pas-de-Calais and in the Nord-Pas-de-Calais region of northern France. It was disbanded following the French canton reorganisation which came into effect in March 2015. It had a total of 20,023 inhabitants (2012).

Geography 
The canton is organised around Lens in the arrondissement of Lens. The altitude varies from 27m to 71m (Lens) for an average altitude of 29m.

The canton comprised 2 communes:
Lens (partly)
Sallaumines

See also 
Cantons of Pas-de-Calais 
Communes of Pas-de-Calais 
Arrondissements of the Pas-de-Calais department

References

Lens-Est
Lens, Pas-de-Calais
2015 disestablishments in France
States and territories disestablished in 2015